Ignatius Josephus van Regemorter was a Flemish historical, landscape, and genre painter and engraver, born at Antwerp in 1785. He studied under his father, Petrus Johannes, also in Paris, Antwerp, Brussels, and Ghent. He died at Antwerp in 1873.

References

External links
 

1785 births
1873 deaths
19th-century Flemish painters
Belgian painters
Belgian genre painters
Artists from Antwerp
19th-century painters of historical subjects